Kanimahuli railway station is a railway station on Howrah–Nagpur–Mumbai line under Kharagpur railway division of South Eastern Railway zone. It is situated at Kanimahuli, Amdangra in East Singhbhum district in the Indian state of Jharkhand.

It is the bordering station of Jharkhand on the Kharagpur–Tatanagar line of South Eastern Railway.

References

Railway stations in East Singhbhum district
Kharagpur railway division